The European Astronaut Centre (EAC) (German: Europäisches Astronautenzentrum, French: Centre des astronautes européens), is an establishment of the European Space Agency and home of the European Astronaut Corps. It is near to Cologne, Germany, and is subdivided into six separate arms, these being Astronaut Training, Space Medicine, Astronaut Management, Human Exploration of the Moon as part of the Spaceship EAC initiative and Communications. It provides training facilities for European and international partner astronauts (including a neutral buoyancy pool), particularly regarding ESA hardware for the ISS such as Columbus and formerly the ATV. The overall European Astronaut Centre organisation is also in charge of the organisation of the training of European astronauts in the centers of other partners, such as the United States (NASA Johnson Space Center), Russia (Star City), Canada (Saint-Hubert) or Japan (Tsukuba).

The Medical Operations arm (the Crew Medical Support Office) concentrates on providing health related support to the European astronauts and their families. Astronaut management supports and directs the careers and mission placements of the astronauts, and Education and PR are involved in activities related to education and outreach and the appropriate representation of the European astronauts and their space activities to the public.

See also
 ESA Centre for Earth Observation (ESRIN)
 European Centre for Space Applications and Telecommunications (ECSAT)
 European Space Agency (ESA)
 European Space Astronomy Centre (ESAC)
 European Space Operations Centre (ESOC)
 European Space Research and Technology Centre (ESTEC)
 European Space Tracking Network (ESTRACK)
 Guiana Space Centre (CSG)

References

External links 

 ESA EAC site
 ESA page with information about EAC
 ESA Astronauts blog
 

European Space Agency
Space technology research institutes
Neutral buoyancy pools
Organisations based in Cologne
Porz